TXARNG may refer to:

Texas Army National Guard
Texas Air National Guard